Léon Ritzen (17 January 1939 – 12 January 2018) was a Belgian footballer who played for Waterschei Thor, Racing White, Beerschot, Diest and the Belgium national team, as a striker.

References

1939 births
2018 deaths
Belgian footballers
Belgium international footballers
K. Waterschei S.V. Thor Genk players
R.W.D. Molenbeek players
K. Beerschot V.A.C. players
K.F.C. Diest players
Association football forwards
Sportspeople from Genk
Footballers from Limburg (Belgium)